Hili may be:

 Tikoloshe, Tokoloshe or Hili — a dwarf-like water Sprite (creature) or zombie, in Zulu mythology
 Hili, Dakshin Dinajpur — a border check-post in West Bengal, India
 Hili (community development block) - an administrative sub-district in Dakshin Dinajpur district in West Bengal, India
 Hili Railway Station - in Dinajpur District, Bangladesh
 Hilis (also, Ilis) — a village in the Khojali Rayon of Azerbaijan
 Hili, Al Ain — a district in the city of Al Ain, Emirate of Abu Dhabi, United Arab Emirates
 The plural of the medical word hilum